An equipment manager is the person in charge of equipment used by a business or organization. Their duties include purchasing, maintenance, repair, inventory, transportation, storage, cleaning, and liquidation. They are responsible for providing the proper equipment for the job, either on-site or off-site. In sports, an equipment manager is a person who is in charge of a sports team's equipment. In professional and collegiate sports, this is usually a full-time job and includes transportation, laundry, repairs, proper safety fittings, and regular service (such as sharpening of skates for ice hockey).

Sports equipment
See: Sports equipment#Various sports

Association football (soccer)
See: Kit (association football)#Equipment
In association football, the kit manager or kit man oversees the players' equipment.

Golf

In golf, the equipment manager oversees the fleet of equipment used on the golf course for turf management. This may include:
 Power take-off Tractors
 Hydraulics or Belt (mechanical) driven Rotary mowers
 Bobcats
 Reel and Bedknife mowers (Hydraulic or belt driven)
 Spray rigs
 Irrigation systems
 Fork lifts
 Front-end loaders
 Gator utility vehicles
 Chain saws
 Trimmers
 Sand Rakers
 Stump grinders
 Golf carts
 Blowers
 Greens rollers
 Pressure washers
And numerous other pieces of equipment a Golf Course or the Turf Care industry employs. 

The term has also been used less frequently as a synonym with "Fleet Manager" (fleet management).

Ice hockey

In ice hockey, the equipment manager takes care of the players and coaches equipment needs by performing the following
Sharpening skates
Ordering equipment
Being prepared on the bench for in-game equipment malfunctions
Distributing practice gear such as jerseys and socks and pants

See also
:Category:Sports equipment
Groundskeeping#Groundskeeping equipment
Athletic Equipment Managers Association

References

External links 
 Athletic Equipment Managers Association 
Sports occupations and roles